Metaparia viridimicans is a species of leaf beetle. It is found in North America.

References

Further reading

 

Eumolpinae
Articles created by Qbugbot
Beetles described in 1892
Taxa named by George Henry Horn
Beetles of the United States